Leo Joseph Nomellini (June 19, 1924 – October 17, 2000) was an Italian-American professional football player and professional wrestler. He played as an offensive and defensive tackle for the San Francisco 49ers of the National Football League (NFL). He was inducted into the Pro Football Hall of Fame.

Nomellini played college football for the Minnesota Gophers.  He was a three-time tag team champion in wrestling.

Early life
Nomellini was born at Lucca, Tuscany, Italy, and immigrated to the United States as an infant to Minnesota, before later moving to Chicago, Illinois, where he attended Crane High School. After high school, he joined the Marine Corps. It was there that in 1942, he first started playing football.

After the war, he received a football scholarship to the University of Minnesota, where he became a two-time  All-American and the 49ers' first-ever NFL draft choice in 1950. While at Minnesota, Nomellini was a member of Delta Chi fraternity.

Professional career
Nomellini was selected in the 1st round (11th overall) of the 1950 NFL draft, the first draft pick in the history of the San Francisco 49ers. As a professional, he appeared in 174 regular-season games and started 166 for his 14-year career.

While with the 49ers, he played both offensive and defensive tackle, winning All-Pro honors at both positions.  He was selected to the All-NFL team six times: two years on offense and four years on defense. "He was as strong as three bulls," said 49ers teammate Joe Perry. "He'd slap you on the back and knock you twenty feet." Nomellini was named to the NFL's all-time team as a defensive tackle. In 1969, he was inducted into the Pro Football Hall of Fame and in 1977, the College Football Hall of Fame.

Professional wrestling

NWA San Francisco
During the off-season Nomellini often wrestled professionally as Leo "The Lion" Nomellini debuting in Minnesota in 1950. For his career, he was a 10-time tag team champion. He won his first tag team championship in NWA San Francisco on March 14, 1952, when he teamed with Hombre Montana. The duo defeated Mike Sharpe and Ben Sharpe for the NWA World Tag Team Championship (San Francisco version). Four months later, Nomellini and Gino Garibaldi won the NWA Pacific Coast Tag Team Championship. In April 1953, Nomellini regained the NWA Pacific Coast Tag Team Championship while teaming with Enrique Torres when they defeated Fred and Ray Atkins. Nomellini and Torres defeated the Mike and Ben Sharpe on May 6, 1953 for the NWA World Tag Team Championship (San Francisco version). On May 11, 1954 Nomellini teamed with Rocky Brown to defeat the Sharpes and win the NWA World Tag Team Championship (San Francisco version). In 1957, Nomellini, again teaming with Torres, defeated Lord James Blears and Ben Sharpe for the NWA World Tag Team Championship (San Francisco version).

While working for the National Wrestling Alliance, Nomellini once defeated Lou Thesz in a two-out-of-three falls match, but was not awarded the NWA World Heavyweight Championship because the first fall was a disqualification.

NWA Minneapolis Wrestling and Boxing Club/American Wrestling Association
Nomellini would leave NWA San Francisco to head to Minnesota to work for Verne Gagne and the NWA Minneapolis Wrestling and Boxing Club.

On May 15, 1958, Nomellini, teaming with Verne Gagne defeated Mike and Doc Gallagher for the NWA World Tag Team Championship (Minneapolis version). He would win the title again on July 14, 1959, while teaming with Butch Levy and defeated Karol and Ivan Kalmikoff. He would win it for the last time on July 19, 1960, once again teaming with Gagne and defeating Stan Kowalski and Tiny Mills.

Nomellini won his final professional wrestling championship on May 23, 1961, when he and Wilbur Snyder defeated Gene Kiniski and Hard Boiled Haggerty for the AWA World Tag Team Championship.

Death
Nomellini died on October 17, 2000, after suffering a stroke.

Championships and accomplishments
George Tragos/Lou Thesz Professional Wrestling Hall of Fame
 Class of 2008
NWA Minneapolis Wrestling and Boxing Club - American Wrestling Association
AWA World Tag Team Championship (1 time) - with Wilbur Snyder
NWA World Tag Team Championship (Minneapolis version) (3 times) - with Verne Gagne (2) and Butch Levy (1)

NWA San Francisco
NWA World Tag Team Championship (San Francisco version) (4 times) - with Hombre Montana (1), Enrique Torres (2), and Rocky Brown (1)

Notes

External links
 Pro Football Hall of Fame Member profile
 New York Times Obituary
 
 

1924 births
2000 deaths
20th-century professional wrestlers
All-American college football players
American football defensive tackles
American football offensive tackles
American male professional wrestlers
College Football Hall of Fame inductees
Italian male professional wrestlers
Minnesota Golden Gophers football players
National Football League players with retired numbers
Italian emigrants to the United States
Players of American football from Illinois
Pro Football Hall of Fame inductees
San Francisco 49ers players
Western Conference Pro Bowl players
United States Marine Corps personnel of World War II
AWA World Tag Team Champions